Ikeda Munemasa (池田宗政) (June 1727 - March 10, 1764) was a daimyō of Iyo Province in the Edo period of Japan. He was the 4th Lord of the Okayama Domain and head of the Ikeda clan. Ikeda's reign began in 1752, following the retirement of his father, Ikeda Tsugumasa, and lasted until his death in 1764. He was lord of Okayama Castle. His childhood name was Shigetaro (茂太郎) later Minechiyo (峯千代).

He authored Portrait of Hitomaro and His Waka Poem, on the subject of the waka poet Kakinomoto no Hitomaro. He was skilled at calligraphy, haikai, painting and waka.

Family
 Father: Ikeda Tsugumasa
 Mother: Kazuhime
 Wife: Kuroda Fujiko
 Children
 Ikeda Harumasa (1750-1819) by Kuroda Fujiko
 Sagara Nagahiro (1752-1813) by Kuroda Fujiko
 Daughter married Sakakibara Masaatsu by Kuroda Fujiko

References

1727 births
1764 deaths
Ikeda clan
Daimyo